(The song of the heights), WAB 74, is a song for double men's choir and three soloists, which Anton Bruckner composed in 1876 on a text by Heinrich von der Mattig.

History 

During the rehearsals, the choir found the work difficult to perform because of the use of humming voices. Therefore, conductor Richard Heuberger asked Bruckner to revise the work. When revising the work in 1879, Bruckner added an accompaniment of strings and brass instruments. On 10 December 1879 a new rehearsal occurred under Bruckner's baton, but was not followed by a public performance. The first public performance occurred posthumously in 1902 in a transcription by Hans Wagner.

Wagner's transcription was issued by Doblinger, Vienna in 1902.

Text 

 is based on a text by Heinrich von der Mattig.

Music 
The 84-bar long work in A-flat major is scored for  double choir, and 2 tenor and a baritone soloists. From "", the melody is taken over by the double choir.

Because of the performance difficulties (humming voices) encountered during the rehearsals, Bruckner added in 1879 an accompaniment of strings (2 violas, 2 cellos and double bass) to enhance the humming voices, and of brass instruments (4 horns, 3 trombones and a tuba) to accompany the double choir.

References

Sources 
 Anton Bruckner – Sämtliche Werke, Band XXIII/2:  Weltliche Chorwerke (1843–1893), Musikwissenschaftlicher Verlag der Internationalen Bruckner-Gesellschaft, Angela Pachovsky and Anton Reinthaler (Editor), Vienna, 1989
 Cornelis van Zwol, Anton Bruckner 1824–1896 – Leven en werken, uitg. Thoth, Bussum, Netherlands, 2012. 
 Uwe Harten, Anton Bruckner. Ein Handbuch. , Salzburg, 1996. .

External links 
 
 Das hohe Lied As-Dur, WAB 74 – Critical discography by Hans Roelofs 
 A transcription for horn ensemble can be heard on YouTube: Anton Bruckner: Das hohe Lied

Weltliche Chorwerke by Anton Bruckner
1876 compositions
1879 compositions
Compositions in A-flat major